The 2006–07 Cymru Alliance was the seventeenth season of the Cymru Alliance after its establishment in 1990. The league was won by Llangefni Town.

League table

External links
Cymru Alliance

Cymru Alliance seasons
2
Wales